New York State Route 135 (NY 135) is a  state highway in eastern Nassau County, New York, in the United States. The route is a limited-access highway that connects Seaford with Syosset. The highway runs from Merrick Road (unsigned County Route 27 or CR 27) in Seaford to NY 25 in Syosset. In between, NY 135 passes through Bethpage and Plainview and serves Bethpage State Park. The highway is ceremoniously designated as the Ralph J. Marino Expressway; however, it is more commonly known as the Seaford–Oyster Bay Expressway.

The origins of the expressway date back to 1954 when engineering pioneer Robert Moses proposed that a highway be built between Wantagh and Oyster Bay. Although communities along the proposed path of the highway opposed its construction, Moses eventually won the grant. Right-of-way was taken in 1958, and construction began in 1959. In 1967, the name of the expressway was renamed from the Wantagh–Oyster Bay Expressway to its current name. The expressway was completed to its current length in 1969; however, a stub exists at each end of the highway. The freeway was designated as NY 135 by 1964.

Around 1970, Robert Moses returned his focus to the expressway, proposing that the highway be extended north from Syosset. This extension would include a long bridge to Rye in Westchester County across the Long Island Sound. The plan received support until it was brought to the federal government, at which point towns began opposing his plans. Governor Nelson Rockefeller cancelled the proposed extension in 1973. In 2007, a developer proposed building a  tunnel to Rye instead. There have also been plans for a southern extension to Jones Beach, but none have been acted on yet.

Route description

The Seaford–Oyster Bay Expressway northbound lanes begins at the on-ramp from Merrick Road (unsigned CR 27) near the outer limits of downtown Seaford in southeastern Nassau County. There is an aging sign at the southern terminus, depicting the highway as "NY 135" and showing the nearest control city as Oyster Bay. The off-ramp begins at a commercial building and turns to the northeast, heading through some trees. After a short distance, the on-ramp merges into the northbound lanes of the expressway.

The expressway progresses northward from the on-ramp, crossing over Waverly Avenue and passing the first guide sign for exit 2 (NY 27), about  ahead from this point. The highway widens to three lanes in each direction as it comes upon the interchange with NY 27. The highway progresses its way northward through the interchange and passes by the first NY 135 northbound shield in the middle of the exit. Trees mainly separate the expressway from the nearby highways and communities. After a short distance, the on-ramp from NY 27 merges into the northbound lanes, and the highway continues northward.

On the southbound side, across from the on-ramp, the southbound lanes split for exit 2E, set specifically for the eastbound alignment of NY 27. Shortly afterward the expressway crosses under both directions of NY 27 on separate bridges. After that, Seamans Neck Road becomes the service road to the expressway, running parallel to the east. There is a bridge over Clark Street in the nearby community of Massapequa, where West Seamans Neck Road, the southbound service road, ends. After a short distance, Seamans Neck Road (CR 191) passes exit 3 for NY 105 and continues west of the expressway going north to Plainedge.

After a while, the expressway passes the North Wantagh Park, and connects to the Southern State Parkway at exit 4. There, the expressway makes a curve to the northeast, crossing over Cordwood Lane on an overpass. The direction of the expressway begins to straighten, until exit 5, where it encounters NY 107. Soon after, the expressway comes upon exit 6, which is for Boundary Avenue (CR 97), a connector to the nearby Bethpage State Parkway. From there, the expressway turns to the north and begins to parallel the Bethpage Parkway as it meets NY 24 (Hempstead Turnpike).

North of NY 24 in Bethpage, NY 135 has an exit leading to Powell Avenue and Plainview Road, the latter serving as a local continuation of the Bethpage Parkway. At this point, the median of the expressway widens as the route heads northward. The wide median was originally constructed to allow the Bethpage Parkway to be extended north to the Caumsett State Parkway and Caumsett State Park. The wide median ends just before exit 9 as the lanes of NY 135 come back together for the exit with Cherry Avenue and Broadway. After interchange 9, the expressway enters Plainview as it crosses over Haypath Road.

As the expressway passes through Plainview it passes beneath Old Country Road (CR 25) at exit 10. Seven interchanges north of the Southern State Parkway, NY 135 comes upon the Northern State Parkway at exit 12. Just after, there is a partial cloverleaf interchange (exit 13) with the Long Island Expressway (I-495) in Locust Grove. The expressway continues north of I-495, heading through Locust Grove to interchanges 14E and 14W. Here, NY 135 ends and merges into NY 25 (the Jericho Turnpike). A stub built for the possible extension of the expressway sits nearby. All traffic merges onto NY 25 west from there.

History

Planning and construction
In 1954, the New York State Department of Public Works (NYSDPW) unveiled plans for a six-lane expressway that would go from the Wantagh State Parkway in Wantagh to NY 106 in Oyster Bay. Unlike the Western Nassau Expressway, a highway proposed two years earlier that would go through densely populated areas in western Nassau County, this roadway would go through lightly populated areas, meaning that acquiring the necessary right-of-way would be easier. Under Robert Moses' original plans for the highway, the northern terminus of the expressway would be placed near brand new local ferry terminals in Oyster Bay. From there, commuters could connect to the city of Stamford, Connecticut,  to the north by way of ferries across Long Island Sound. The proposed highway was added to the New York State Highway Law as follows, with annotations in brackets:

 ... Seaford–Oyster Bay expressway, beginning at a point on the Wantagh parkway in the vicinity of the hamlet of Wantagh, thence running generally through or near the hamlets of Seaford, Bethpage and Plainview to a point on state highway nine thousand twenty-one [NY 106] south of the village of Oyster Bay; ...

One of the major problems with the proposed alignment of the expressway was that it divided each community that it passed through. This was met by protests from all of the communities. To remedy the concerns, Lewis Waters, the Oyster Bay Town Supervisor, proposed a new alignment for the expressway. Under his plan, it would now begin at the Ocean Parkway in Tobay Beach, cross Great South Bay and enter West Amityville at Clocks Boulevard. From West Amityville, the expressway was to turn to the northeast near the current-day Sunrise Mall, and progress its way through Massapequa and Farmingdale into Bethpage State Park. The highway was to cross through Bethpage State Park using the old right-of-way for the Bethpage State Parkway through the communities of Old Bethpage and Plainview. At the Long Island Rail Road's Port Jefferson Branch, it would follow the originally planned alignment, but would end at NY 25A instead of NY 106.

This plan, supported by the residents of Oyster Bay, would require the acquisition of 185 residential homes. In comparison, the alignment planned by Moses would result in the elimination of 450 homes. However, Moses' plan won out, to much of their dismay.

In 1958, NYSDPW acquired the right-of-way for the highway. From Seaford north to the Southern State Parkway near Plainedge, the right-of-way followed the alignment of Seamans Neck Road, then an uninterrupted local road extending from Merrick Road in Seaford north to NY 107 and Union Avenue in Plainedge. Also in 1958, the Nassau County Department of Public Works signed over 100 county highways around the county. According to the 1959 Master Plan for the county by the public works department, Seamans Neck Road was initially designated as CR 191, but only from Merrick Road to the proposed interchange between the expressway and NY 105, where Seamans Neck Road would meet the new highway. The CR 191 designation was eventually eliminated.

Construction commenced on the expressway a year later, with the section from Old Country Road (exit 10) to Jericho Turnpike (exits 14E and 14W) opening in June 1962. Construction continued rapidly, with the section from Old Country Road down to the Southern State Parkway (exit 4) being completed only a year later. The incomplete expressway was designated as NY 135 by 1964.

From there, the construction slowed, with the final piece from Merrick Road (CR 27) to the Southern State Parkway opening to traffic in late 1969.

Extension proposals

Bridge to Rye
In 1957, a plan for a bridge to Westchester County across Long Island Sound was first proposed by Charles H. Sells, a former commissioner for the New York State Department of Public Works. His proposal for the Oyster Bay–Rye Bridge, along with the eastern Orient Point–Watch Hill Bridge were two proposed bridge routes off Long Island. Sells, however, suggested that the bridges not be constructed until Long Island's traffic and commuting began to increase.

In seven years, Long Island underwent the transformation that Sells had expected, and the east–west arterials between Long Island and New York City, such as the Northern State Parkway and the Long Island Expressway, were congested with commuters. Motorists bound for New England or upstate regions of New York had to take either the Throgs Neck Bridge or the Bronx–Whitestone Bridge, and both bridges were already reaching their designed capacities. Robert Moses, chairman of the Triborough Bridge and Tunnel Authority, worked with the Department of Public Works to commission a $150,000 (1964 USD) study by the firm Madigan-Hyland to study the feasibility of a bridge across the sound.

Moses revealed the results of the study to the Nassau and Suffolk Regional Planning Board in February 1966. The Oyster Bay–Rye Bridge (originally the Bayville–Rye Bridge) was proposed to complete the Interstate 287 (I-287) beltway around the New York Metropolitan Area. This was to be done by constructing a  cable-stayed suspension bridge from the Cross-Westchester Expressway (I-287) in Rye to the Seaford–Oyster Bay Expressway (NY 135) in Nassau County. The proposed bridge was to cost $150 million (1966 USD) and had the support of Governor Nelson Rockefeller and many officials on Long Island.

However, Moses ran into a problem once the proposal was brought to the Federal Highway Administration. At this point, opposition to the bridge began to form on both sides of Long Island Sound. In addition, plans to turn the Oyster Bay area into a bird sanctuary and a protected park made working on the highway harder as building on such protected places is forbidden by law. Faced with growing opposition, Governor Rockefeller cancelled the plans for the bridge on June 20, 1973, nine years after the first proposal by Moses.

Nine ideas were discussed in the 1950s, 1960s, and 1970s, but all were cancelled. Some were reconsidered during the 1990s, but the New York State Department of Transportation (NYSDOT) backed away from the idea in belief that it would not relieve congestion.

Highway extensions
Since the demise of the proposed bridge across Long Island Sound, several proposed northward extensions of NY 135 have arisen, none of which have been acted on. In 1973, the Tri-State Transportation Commission proposed restudying the idea of extending the expressway northward back to its originally-planned northern terminus, the hamlet of Oyster Bay, even though the bridge project was shelved. The commission stated, "With the abandonment of the Oyster Bay–Rye Bridge proposal, the need to extend the Seaford–Oyster Bay Expressway northward to NY 25A or NY 106 should be restudied." They added that the study would be probable, even with the abandonment of working on the NY 135 corridor.

In 1990, the Long Island Regional Planning Board came up with a proposed multibillion-dollar plan to expand the capacities of state and county highways and to improve all major roads to "satisfactory" levels by 2010. The proposal also revisited the idea of extending the Seaford–Oyster Bay Expressway to NY 25A in Oyster Bay via the right-of-way bought in the 1960s. NYSDOT reconsidered the idea a decade later in 2000, saying it would relieve congestion in the area. They indicated that the extension may be built as either a "full-build" expressway or a four-lane arterial boulevard to NY 25A. However, there are no plans to do either at this time.

In 2007, a developer proposed the idea of crossing Long Island Sound by way of a tunnel instead of a bridge. To prevent the noticeable tunnel, the developer proposed building a park atop the entrance with ball fields, tennis courts, and several other amenities.

When the first proposals for a southern extension of NY 135 came out in 1967, around 25 families were relocated to clear a  right-of-way for the highway. By 1975, the Tri-State Transportation Commission proposed a plan to extend the highway south to the Wantagh State Parkway, which was NY 135's originally-planned southern terminus. This would have provided another connection to Jones Beach via the Wantagh Parkway. However, the idea was not acted upon and was shelved by NYSDOT in 1980. The right-of-way for the extension was held onto by the state until 2004 when they sold it to Nassau County. Nassau County plans to build a county recreational trail along that right-of-way.

Recent history and proposals
There are a number of projects either in progress or in development for NY 135. In the 2000s, NYSDOT repaired segments of NY 135, along with many other highways in Nassau and nearby Suffolk counties, where the concrete was beginning to wear out. The project was projected to end in mid-2008, but the department has not updated their project site with the construction. In late 2006, development began on a project to construct a 100-parking space Park & Ride at the interchange of NY 135 and NY 25. Work on the project was expected to begin in mid-2015 and end in the middle of 2016. Funds would come from the federal government and the state of New York.

Another planned NYSDOT project is the replacement of the steel barrier for the median of NY 135 from Merrick Road to NY 24. The department will replace it with a normal concrete barrier and will also resurface the entire stretch of highway. The project is to cost $41.6 million of state and federal funding and begin in late 2010 and early 2011. It is expected to be completed by early 2012.

This caused major traffic delays and congestion as police had to shut down three of the major transportation routes in the area. Nassau County police ordered the evacuation of 1,000 residents in the immediate area, along with nearby commuter routes, the Sunrise Highway and Long Island Rail Road's Montauk Branch. With the possibility of an explosion, emergency personnel could not approach the tanker. Since the fire was close to the LIRR station in Seaford, a spokesman said that they had shut all service down from Wantagh to Massapequa. The Long Island Rail Road attempted using buses, but with the congestion becoming worse, they routed the buses to Hicksville, where the passengers would take a diesel train to Bethpage and nearby Babylon to continue progress eastward. The Seaford–Oyster Bay Expressway was shut down from Merrick Road to the Southern State Parkway. Police reported that the tanker broke a rear axle, and skidded, causing it to overturn. The tank ruptured, starting the blaze. The driver, a middle-aged man from Westbury, escaped with few injuries.

When the Seaford–Oyster Bay Expressway was first built, the highway was known as the Wantagh–Oyster Bay Expressway. The route was changed to its current name in 1967. The change was made both to avoid confusion with the Wantagh Parkway and to accommodate a request from the community of Seaford to popularize their town. There have also been attempts to rename the expressway with dedications to various Presidents of the United States such as Theodore Roosevelt and Ronald Reagan. However, in March 2002, the New York State Legislature officially dedicated the expressway after Ralph J. Marino, a New York State Senator from Long Island. At the time, the designation was a tribute to Marino; however, he died just two weeks later.

Between the Powell Avenue and Broadway / Plainview Road interchanges along the expressway, the highway is divided with a large median. The lane alignment was set up so that the proposed extension of the Bethpage State Parkway would have run within the median of NY 135. The parkway would have followed the highway for a short distance before turning to the southeast and away from NY 135. By making this possible, the Bethpage Parkway would likely have to have been upgraded from its current super-two configuration into a four-lane highway.

NYSDOT had created a project page for the Bethpage Parkway extension, which was viewed by the department as a long-term project. As part of the project, the parkway would have been extended north from the traffic circle with Plainview Road to NY 135. The project was tentatively scheduled to start in mid-2025 and wrap up in early 2027 and cost $27.9 million. The page was taken down by November 2010.

Exit list

See also

 List of county routes in Nassau County, New York

References

External links

 The unfinished northern end of the Seaford Oyster Bay Expressway on Google Maps
 The unfinished southern end of the Seaford Oyster Bay Expressway on Google Maps
 NY 135 (Greater New York Roads)

135
Roads on Long Island
Transportation in Nassau County, New York
Limited-access roads in New York (state)
135
Unfinished buildings and structures in the United States